Ludmilla (Ludmiła) of Bohemia (died 14 August 1240) was a daughter of Frederick, Duke of Bohemia, and his wife,  Elizabeth of Hungary. Ludmilla was a member of the Přemyslid dynasty. She was Duchess consort of Bavaria by her marriage to Louis I, Duke of Bavaria.

Family
Ludmilla was the third of six children born to her parents. Her siblings were Helena of Bohemia, betrothed to Manuel I Komnenos but never married, and Sophia of Bohemia, wife of Albert, Margrave of Meissen. The rest of Ludmilla's siblings were short-lived or died in early adulthood.

Ludmilla's paternal grandparents were Vladislaus II of Bohemia and his first wife Gertrude of Babenberg. Her maternal grandparents were Géza II of Hungary and his wife Euphrosyne of Kiev.

Geza was son of Béla II of Hungary and his wife Helena of Raška.

Bela was son of Prince Álmos and his wife Predslava of Kiev, who was daughter of Sviatopolk II of Kiev and an unknown Bohemian princess.

Marriages
Ludmilla married twice and had issue in both of her marriages. Her first marriage was to Count Albert III of Bogen, making Ludmilla Countess of Bogen. The couple had three children from their marriage, all sons:
 Berthold IV, Count of Bogen (d. 1218) married Kunigunda of Hirschberg, no known issue
 Albert IV, Count of Bogen (d. 1242) married Richeza of Dillingen
 Diepold of Bogen (d. 1219) a priest in Regensburg

Albert died in 1197 and was succeeded by his eldest son with Ludmilla, Berthold.

Ludmilla then married Louis I, Duke of Bavaria, a former enemy of her first husband. The marriage was good for Louis because it created an alliance with Ludmilla's uncle, Ottokar I of Bohemia. The couple had one son:
 Otto II Wittelsbach, Duke of Bavaria (7 April 1206 – 29 November 1253), next Duke of Bavaria.

Louis and Ludmilla tried to find a suitable bride for their only child. Otto married Agnes of the Palatinate in 1222. Within time, Agnes' closer relatives died and she became Countess of Palatinate, which became part of the Bavarian inheritance, starting with Ludmilla's grandson, Louis II, Duke of Bavaria.

Widowhood
Louis was murdered in 1231 on a bridge in Kelheim. The crime was never cleared up since the murderer was immediately lynched. Due to the following aversion of the Wittelsbach family the city of Kelheim lost its status as one of the ducal residences. Louis was buried in the crypt of Scheyern Abbey.

Ludmilla lived to see the birth of four or five grandchildren from Otto and Agnes: Louis II, Henry XIII, Duke of Bavaria, Elisabeth of Bavaria, Queen of Germany, Sophie and Agnes.

Ludmilla founded the Seligenthal convent, near Landshut, in 1232. She remained here for the rest of her days. Ludmilla died there 14 August 1240 and her body was buried there.

Ancestors

References 

Bohemian princesses
Přemyslid dynasty
House of Wittelsbach
German people of Czech descent
Czech people of Hungarian descent
12th-century births
1240 deaths
Female murder victims
Year of birth unknown
13th-century Bohemian women
13th-century German women
13th-century Bohemian people
13th-century German nobility